Leucuşeşti may refer to several villages in Romania:

 Leucuşeşti, a village in Preutești Commune, Suceava County
 Leucuşeşti, a village in Bethausen Commune, Timiș County